Golden Dragon, Silver Snake is a 1979 Hong Kong martial arts film directed by Godfrey Ho, starring martial artist Dragon Lee, Kong Do.

External links
 IMDb entry

1979 films
1970s action films
Hong Kong martial arts films
1970s Cantonese-language films
1970s Hong Kong films